Tim Chandler (February 3, 1960 – October 8, 2018) was an American bass guitar player, best known for his work with the rock bands Daniel Amos, the Swirling Eddies (credited as Berger Roy Al) and the Choir.

Chandler was also a session musician in the Los Angeles and Nashville circuit, recording and touring for artists such as Randy Stonehill, Tonio K, Isaac Air Freight, Mike Stand, Phil Keaggy, Chuck Girard, Pierce Pettis, Tom Howard, John Austin, Lost Dogs, Fernando Ortega and Riki Michelle.

In 2000, when Daniel Amos was recording its Mr. Buechner's Dream album, Chandler and a few friends decided to make a documentary of the making of the album. That footage, which showed the band rehearsing and recording songs for the album, was later edited together and released on the DVD, The Making of Mr. Buechner's Dream.

Chandler died on October 8, 2018, aged 58, of natural causes.

References

American rock bass guitarists
American male bass guitarists
1960 births
2018 deaths
People from Nashville, Tennessee
Place of death missing
Place of birth missing
Guitarists from Tennessee
20th-century American bass guitarists
Daniel Amos members
The Choir (alternative rock band) members
20th-century American male musicians